Greg Porter is an American game designer who has worked primarily on role-playing games.

Career
Greg Porter's Blacksburg Tactical Research Center was one of a few game companies active in Blacksburg, Virginia in the 1980s and 1990s.  Porter initially came to attention for designing TimeLords and Macho Women with Guns RPGs in the late 1980s; he then put his energy into two successive generic RPG systems, CORPS and EABA.

Porter subsequently wrote articles for Hogshead Publishing's Inter*action magazine. He also did work for Imperium Games, writing about equipment and vehicles for the fourth edition of Traveller. After meeting Ron Edwards and other members of The Forge in 2002, Porter became increasingly involved in the indie role-playing game movement.

References

Further reading
 D. Mackay, The Fantasy Role-Playing Game: A New Performing Art, MacFarland & Company, 2001. , pp 25,26,158,173-174

External links
 

GURPS writers
Living people
Role-playing game designers
Year of birth missing (living people)